This is a list of civil wars or other internal civil conflicts fought during the history of the Eastern Roman or Byzantine Empire (330–1453). The definition of organized civil unrest is any conflict that was fought within the borders of the Byzantine Empire, with at least one opposition leader against the ruling government. For external conflicts, see the list of Byzantine wars. For the period before the division of the Roman Empire in West and East, see List of Roman civil wars and revolts (753 BCE – 476 CE).

4th century
 399: Revolt of Tribigild in Phrygia.
 400: Revolt of Gainas.

5th century
 479: Attempted usurpation of Marcian
 484: First Samaritan Revolt
 484–488: Rebellion of Illus and Leontius against Emperor Zeno
 492–497: Isaurian War
 495: Second Samaritan Revolt

6th century
 513–515: Rebellions of Vitalian against Anastasius I.
 529–531: Third Samaritan Revolt under Julianus ben Sabar.
 532: Outbreak of the popular Nika revolt in Constantinople. Hypatius proclaimed Emperor and later executed by Justinian and Theodora.
 536–537: Military revolt in Africa, led by Stotzas.
 555/556: Fourth Samaritan Revolt.

7th century
 602: Revolt and usurpation of Phocas.
 603–604: Rebellion of general Narses against Phocas.
 608–610: Revolt of Africa under Heraclius the Elder, successful seizure of the throne by his son Heraclius the Younger.
 610–611: Revolt of general Comentiolus, brother of Phocas, against Heraclius.
 613-628: Jewish revolt against Heraclius, short lived Sassanid Jewish Commonwealth is formed.
 617/618: John of Conza seizes Naples but is killed by the exarch Eleutherius.
 640: Rebellion of general Titus in Mesopotamia in protest against excesses committed by other Byzantine troops.
 644/645: Failed coup by Valentinus against his son-in-law Constans II.
 646–647: Rebellion of Gregory the Patrician, Exarch of Africa.
 650–652: Rebellion of Olympius, Exarch of Ravenna.
 ca. 651: Rebellion and defection to the Arabs of Armenian soldiers under Theodore Rshtuni.
 667: Revolt of Saborios, the general of the Armeniacs.
 668–669: Murder of Constans II and attempted usurpation by Mizizios in Sicily.
 680: Abortive revolt of the Anatolic theme in favour of Constantine IV's brothers.
 692/693: Revolt and defection to the Muslims of the Armenian patrician Smbat.
 695: Revolt and usurpation of Leontios against Justinian II.
 695–717: Twenty Years' Anarchy after the deposition of emperor Justinian II
 698: Revolt and overthrow of Leontios by the army returning from the failed expedition against Carthage.

8th century
 705: Overthrow of Tiberios Apsimaros by Justinian II.
 709: Rebellion in Ravenna led by George against the arrest of archbishop Felix,  led by Georgios
 711: Rebellion of the Chersonites led by Philippikos Bardanes leads to the successful overthrow of Justinian II.
 715: Revolt of the Opsician troops at Rhodes results in a six-month civil war. Anastasios II abdicates in favour of Theodosios III.
 716–717: Revolt and successful usurpation of general Leo the Isaurian.
 717/8: Revolt of Sergius, governor of Sicily, who declares Basil Onomagoulos as emperor.
 726/4: Uprising in Venice against Byzantium. The cause was the iconoclastic decrees of Emperor Leo III the Isaurian. The rebels elect Orso Ipato the Doge of Venice. 
 726/7: Revolt of the Helladic Theme under the tourmarches Agallianos Kontoskeles and a certain Stephen against the iconoclastic policies of Leo III.
 741–743: Revolt and usurpation of Artabasdos against Constantine V.
 780: Abortive coup in favour of Nikephoros, a brother of Leo IV.
 781–782: Imperial expedition against Elpidius, governor of Sicily.
 790: Military revolt against the regency of Irene of Athens. Her son Constantine VI is made sole ruler.
 792–793: Rebellion of the Armeniacs against the restoration of Irene of Athens as co-ruler by Constantine VI.
 800: Uprising in Cappadocia, instigated by Staurakios.

9th century
 803: Revolt of Bardanes Tourkos
 821–823: Revolt of Thomas the Slav
 827: Revolt of admiral Euphemius in Sicily
 837: Revolt of the Smolyani Slavic tribe in the Balkans
 838–839: Revolt of the Khurramite troops under Theophobos
 866: Revolt of Symbatios the Armenian and George Peganes in western Asia Minor against the rise of Basil the Macedonian

10th century
 919: Unsuccessful rebellion by Leo Phokas the Elder against the seizing of power by Romanos Lekapenos
 921: Revolt by the Slavic Melingoi and Ezeritai tribes in the Peloponnese.
 ca. 922: Revolt by Bardas Boilas, governor of Chaldia.
 ca. 930: Popular revolt of Basil the Copper Hand in Opsikion.
 970: Rebellion of the Phokas supporters under Bardas Phokas the Younger against John I Tzimiskes.
 976–979: Rebellion of Bardas Skleros against Basil II.
 987–989: Rebellion of Bardas Phokas the Younger against Basil II.

11th century
 1022: Revolt of Nikephoros Xiphias and Nikephoros Phokas Barytrachelos against Basil II.
 1026–1027: Revolt of Basil Skleros.
 1034: Popular revolt under Elpidios Brachamios at Antioch.
 1034–35: Rebellion of Serbs under Stefan Vojislav.
 1038–39: Rebellion of Serbs under Stefan Vojislav.
 1040: Revolt of Gregory Taronites in Phrygia.
 1040–1041: Uprising of Peter Delyan, a Bulgarian rebellion in the western and southern Balkans.
 April 1042: Popular uprising in Constantinople against Michael V Kalaphates, who was deposed. Empress Zoë Porphyrogenita was restored as empress, and her sister Theodora Porphyrogenita was crowned co-empress against her will. 
 Mid-1042: Revolt of the governor of Cyprus, Theophilos Erotikos, crushed by new emperor Constantine IX Monomachos
 1042–1043: Rebellion of George Maniakes against Constantine IX Monomachos, crushed when Maniakes died in battle in near Thessalonika.
 1047: Revolt of Leo Tornikios against Constantine IX.
 1057: Revolt of Hervé Frankopoulos.
 1057: Revolt and successful usurpation by Isaac I Komnenos (Battle of Petroe).
 1066: Revolt against heavy taxation in Thessaly under Nikoulitzas Delphinas.
 1071–1072: Byzantine war of succession, after Byzantine emperor Romanos IV Diogenes was defeated in the Battle of Manzikert (26 August 1071) and deposed when John Doukas enthroned Michael VII Doukas in Constantinople (24 October 1071). The war consisted of the Battle of Dokeia and the Sieges of Tyropoion and Adana, all of which Romanos lost. Simultaneously, the Uprising of Georgi Voyteh (1072) took place in Bulgaria, which was also crushed by Michael VII.
 1072: Uprising of Georgi Voyteh
 1073–1074: Revolt of Roussel de Bailleul proclaims Caesar John Doukas Emperor.
 1077–1078: Revolt and successful usurpation by Nikephoros III Botaneiates.
 1077–1078: Revolt of Nikephoros Bryennios the Elder against Michael VII Doukas and Nikephoros III, defeated at the Battle of Kalavrye.
 1078: Revolt of Philaretos Brachamios against Michael VII Doukas.
 1078: Revolt of Nikephoros Basilakes against Nikephoros III.
 1080–1081: Revolt of Nikephoros Melissenos against Nikephoros III.
 1081: Revolt and successful usurpation by Alexios I Komnenos.
 1091–92: Rebellion of vassal Vukan in Serbia.
 1092: Rebellions of Karykes at Crete and Rhapsomates at Cyprus.
 1095: Cuman invasion of Thrace in support of the impostor pretender Constantine Diogenes.
 1095–1098: Revolt of Theodore Gabras, governor of Chaldia.

12th century
 1102: Rebellion of vassal Vukan in Serbia.
 1149: Rebellion of vassals Uroš II and Desa in Serbia.
 1166: Rebellion of vassal Stefan Nemanja in Serbia.
 1181: Popular uprising in Constantinople in support of Maria Komnene against Alexios Komnenos.
 1182: Revolt and successful usurpation of Andronikos I Komnenos, resulting in the Massacre of the Latins
 1183/1184: Revolt of general Andronikos Lapardas.
 1183/1184: Revolt of John Komnenos Vatatzes, governor of the Thracesian theme, against the regency of Andronikos I Komnenos.
 1184: Revolt of Theodore Kantakouzenos, governor of Prussa.
 1184–1191: Revolt and establishment of a breakaway regime by Isaac Komnenos at Cyprus.
 1185: Uprising of Asen and Peter, establishment of the Second Bulgarian Empire.
 1185: Revolt and successful usurpation by Isaac II Angelos.
 1187: Revolt of Alexios Branas against Isaac II Angelos.
 1188–1189: Revolt and establishment of a breakaway regime by Theodore Mangaphas at Philadelphia.
 1190–1204/05: Revolt and establishment of a breakaway regime by Basil Chotzas at Tarsia.
 1192: Revolt of Pseudo-Alexios II.

13th century
 ca. 1200–1206: Revolt and establishment of a breakaway regime by Leo Chamaretos in Laconia.
 ca. 1200–1208: Revolt and establishment of a breakaway regime by Leo Sgouros in NE Peloponnese and Central Greece.
 1201: Coup by John Komnenos the Fat against Alexios III Angelos in Constantinople is violently suppressed.
 1201: Revolt of John Spyridonakes in Macedonia.
 1201–1202: Revolt of Manuel Kamytzes and Dobromir Chrysos in Thessaly and Macedonia.
 1202–1204: Fourth Crusade was redirected to Constantinople to intervene in a Byzantine succession dispute after the deposition of emperor Isaac II Angelos
 1204–1205: Second revolt and establishment of a breakaway regime by Theodore Mangaphas at Philadelphia.
 1204–1205: Revolt and establishment of a breakaway regime by Manuel Maurozomes at Phrygia.
 1204–1206: Revolt and establishment of a breakaway regime by Sabas Asidenos in the lower Maeander River.
 1204–1206: Revolt and establishment of a breakaway regime by John Kantakouzenos at Messenia.
 1222–1224: Isaac and Alexios Laskaris flee to the Latin Empire in opposition to the accession of John III Vatatzes. In 1224 they return at the head of a Latin army, but are defeated and captured at the Battle of Poimanenon.
 1225: Revolt of Isaac and Andronikos Nestongos against John III Vatatzes.

14th century
 1321, 1322, and 1327–1328: Byzantine civil war of 1321–1328. Intermittent civil war between Andronikos II Palaiologos and his grandson Andronikos III Palaiologos
 1341–1347: Byzantine civil war of 1341–1347 or Second Palaiologan Civil War between John VI Kantakouzenos and the regency for John V Palaiologos, including Anna of Savoy
 1342–1350: Revolt and establishment of breakaway regime by the Zealots of Thessalonica
 1352–1357: Byzantine civil war of 1352–1357 between John V Palaiologos, John VI Kantakouzenos and Matthew Kantakouzenos
 1373–1379: Byzantine civil war of 1373–79. Revolt and usurpation of Andronikos IV Palaiologos

15th century
 1453–1454: Popular revolt in the Despotate of the Morea against the despots Demetrios and Thomas Palaiologos. It is suppressed by Ottoman troops.

See also

 List of Byzantine usurpers
 Medieval Wars
 Political mutilation in Byzantine culture

References

Sources 
 
 
 
 
 

 
Byzantine civil wars
War